Belmont Street may refer to:
 Belmont Street, Aberdeen
 Belmont Street (Montreal)
 Belmont Street (EP), a play

See also 
 Belmont (disambiguation)